WINV (1560 AM, "Classic Hits the Fox") was a radio station broadcasting a classic hits music format, simulcasting WXOF 96.3 FM Yankeetown, Florida. Formerly licensed to Beverly Hills, Florida, United States, and originally licensed to Inverness, the station was owned by WGUL-FM, Inc. and featured programming from Citadel Media and Dial Global.

WINV went silent on October 9, 2011. On September 4, 2012, the station's owners submitted the license to the Federal Communications Commission (FCC) for cancellation, saying they had no plans to return the station to the air. The FCC cancelled the station's license and deleted the WINV call sign from the FCC database.

References

External links

INV
Radio stations established in 1966
Radio stations disestablished in 2012
Defunct radio stations in the United States
1966 establishments in Florida
2012 disestablishments in Florida
INV
INV